Zotz may refer to:

 Zotz (surname)
 Zotz!, a 1962 film based on a 1947 novel by Walter Karig
 Zotz (candy), a fizzing hard candy
 El Zotz, an archaeological site in Guatemala
 The month Zotz or Sotz of the Haab' Pre-Columbian Maya calendar

See also
 Camazotz, bat god in Maya mythology
 Zot!, comic book created by Scott McCloud
 Zot!, sound reported in B. C. (comic strip) when the anteater lashes his tongue at ants